Brownlow is a surname. Notable people with the surname include:

 Baron Brownlow, a title in the Peerage of Great Britain
 Brownlow baronets, two Baronetcies
 Adelbert Brownlow-Cust, 3rd Earl Brownlow (1844–1921), British soldier and politician
 Charles Brownlow, 1st Baron Lurgan (1795–1847), Anglo-Irish politician
 Charles Brownlow, 2nd Baron Lurgan (1831–1882), Anglo-Irish politician
 Charles Henry Brownlow (1831–1916), senior Indian Army officer
 Chas Brownlow (1861–1924), Australian rules football administrator for whom the Brownlow Medal is named
 David Brownlow, sound engineer
 Kevin Brownlow (born 1938), British filmmaker and film historian
 Louis Brownlow (1879–1963), American political scientist and consultant on public administration; chairman of the Brownlow Committee
 Peregrine Cust, 6th Baron Brownlow (1899–1978), British peer
 Richard Brownlow (1553–1638), Chief Prothonotary of the Court of Common Pleas at Westminster
 Walter P. Brownlow (1851–1910), American politician
 William Brownlow (1726–1794), Anglo-Irish politician
 William Gannaway Brownlow (1805–1877), American journalist, clergyman and politician

Fictional characters:
 Mr. Brownlow, from Charles Dickens's novel Oliver Twist
 Charles Brownlow (The Bill), from the TV series The Bill

See also
Brownlow, West Virginia
 Brownlow Committee, a 1937 American committee on government administration, chaired by Louis Brownlow
 Brownlow Medal, an award in the Australian Football league, named for Chas Brownlow
 Brownlow, Cheshire, a United Kingdom location
 Brownlow, St Helens, a United Kingdom location 
Brownlow, South Australia, a locality in Australia
Brownlow KI, South Australia, a locality on Kangaroo Island in Australia